The fire-tailed myzornis (Myzornis pyrrhoura) is a bird species. Its genus Myzornis is monotypic, and has recently been placed in the family Paradoxornithidae.

Description
The wing is black and white with a streak of bright red and the sides of the tail are red too. The bill is long, slightly curved and black.

Distribution and habitat
The species is found in Bhutan, China, India, Myanmar, and Nepal. Its natural habitat is subtropical or tropical moist montane forests. It is a common species in the upper ridges of the Sikkim and Arunachal Himalayas; mostly between 9,000 ft and 13,000 ft according to climatic conditions and seasonal variation. It prefers bamboo thickets, Rhododendron shrubs, birches, and junipers. There is some seasonal movement, the bird descending to lower altitudes in autumn.

Ecology
The fire-tailed myzornis feeds on insects, spiders and small arthropods, as well as consuming fruit, nectar and sap from trees. In India and Nepal the breeding season is April to June, but the season may be longer in Bhutan, as juveniles have been observed in mid-September.

Gallery

References

Further reading

External links
Image and Classification at Animal Diversity Web

fire-tailed myzornis
Birds of Myanmar
Birds of Nepal
Birds of Northeast India
Birds of Tibet
Birds of Yunnan
fire-tailed myzornis
fire-tailed myzornis
Taxonomy articles created by Polbot